State of Grace is an American comedy-drama series that ran for two seasons on FOX Family Channel, later ABC Family (now Freeform) during 2001 and 2002.

Plot
The show is centered on two 12-year-old girls from very different backgrounds, Hannah and Grace, who are best friends. Hannah is from a middle class Jewish family and lives with her parents, her grandmother, and her uncle. Her parents are the owners of a furniture factory in the fictitious town of Ashmore, North Carolina, to where they have recently moved from Chicago. Grace is from a wealthy Catholic family and lives with her mother, a socialite. Typically, they are depicted as more intelligent, thoughtful, funny, and rebellious than other children of their age. Set in 1965, the show was compared by some to another look-back-through-the-years show, The Wonder Years.  Fred Savage, the star of that hit ABC series, even appeared in the series' final episode.

The theme song is the original version of "Do You Believe in Magic" by The Lovin' Spoonful. The show was taped at Ren-Mar Studios stage 4.

Cast and characters

Main
Alia Shawkat: 12-year-old Jewish-American girl Hannah Rayburn
Mae Whitman: 12-year-old Emma 'Grace' McKee, Hannah's best friend
Dinah Manoff: Evelyn Rayburn, Hannah's mother
Michael Mantell: David Rayburn, Hannah's father
Faye Grant: Tattie McKee, Grace's mother
Jason Blicker: Uncle Heschie, Hannah's uncle
Erica Yohn: Grandma Ida, Hannah's grandmother
Frances McDormand: Narrator, voice of adult Hannah

Guest stars
Bryan Neal: Walker Adams, Grace's older half-brother
Bonnie Bailey-Reed: Shirley, the Rayburns' receptionist
Carl M. Craig: Greer, the McKees' chauffeur
Patricia Forte: Cookie, the McKees' maid
Tom Verica: Tommy Austin, Tattie's fiancé
Adrian Neil: Nigel Grenville III, Tattie's friend

Cast collaborations
The two main actresses, Shawkat and Whitman, went on to co-star on Fox's Arrested Development. Shawkat was in the main cast and Whitman was a recurring guest star in season two and the beginning of season three 2004–2005. Shawkat played Maeby Funke on the show, while Whitman played Ann Veal, the girlfriend of Maeby's cousin George Michael Bluth who was portrayed by Michael Cera. Shawkat, Manoff and Mantell would later have roles in the film Bart Got a Room.

Episodes

Season 1 (2001)

Season 2 (2002)

Awards and nominations
The series was created by Brenda Lilly and Hollis Rich and was recipient of many awards including The Parents Television Council, the Humanitas Award, and a Jewish Image Award. Shawkat and Whitman were both nominated for the Young Artist Award for the Best Performance in a TV Comedy Series – Leading Young Actress in 2002.

References

External links

 

2000s American comedy-drama television series
2000s American teen drama television series
2001 American television series debuts
2002 American television series endings
ABC Family original programming
Religious comedy television series
Religious drama television series
Television series about children
Television series about families
Television series about Jews and Judaism
Television shows set in North Carolina
Television series set in 1965
Television series by Disney–ABC Domestic Television